The 2000 FIRA Women's European Championship was the fifth edition of the tournament. It saw virtually the same format as 1997.

In Pool A Ireland returned to the competition.

In "Pool B" a tournament had been planned involving Belgium, Germany, Netherlands and Russia. Belgium and Russia withdrew "at the last minute" and were replaced by a French regional team (Flandre). After a double round-robin between these three teams, Germany and Netherlands played against the teams finishing 7th and 8th in Pool A

Pool A

Bracket

First round

Plate semi-finals

Semi-finals

7th/8th place
Italy awarded 7th place
Ireland awarded 8th place

Plate final

3rd/4th place

Final

Pool B
Games where 20 Minutes each way.

Final table

Results

Pool A/Pool B playoffs
Germany and Netherlands then "played off" against the teams listed as being in 7th and 8th place in Pool A.

External links
FIRA website

See also
Women's international rugby union

2000
2000 rugby union tournaments for national teams
International women's rugby union competitions hosted by Spain
1999–2000 in European women's rugby union
1999–2000 in French rugby union
1999–2000 in Italian rugby union
1999–2000 in English rugby union
1999–2000 in Welsh rugby union
1999–2000 in Scottish rugby union
1999–2000 in Irish rugby union
2000 in Dutch sport
2000 in Kazakhstani sport
rugby union
rugby union
rugby union
rugby union
rugby union
rugby union
1999–2000 in Spanish rugby union
May 2000 sports events in Europe